Bucculatrix ulmicola is a moth in the family Bucculatricidae. It was described by Vladimir Ivanovitsch Kuznetzov in 1962. It is found in Armenia, Kazakhstan, Turkmenistan, Uzbekistan, Tajikistan, Ukraine and southern Russia.

The larvae feed on Ulmus species. They mine the leaves of their host plant.

References

Bucculatricidae
Moths described in 1962
Moths of Europe
Moths of Asia